Paloveere may refer to:

Paloveere, Setomaa Parish, village in Meremäe Parish, Võru County
Paloveere, Võru Parish, village in Vastseliina Parish, Võru County